Love Accidentally is an American romantic comedy film written by Robert Dean Klein, directed by Peter Sullivan, and starring Brenda Song and Aaron O'Connell. It was released on Amazon Freevee on July 15, 2022.

The film received a generally negative response from critics, calling it one of the worst films of 2022.

Plot
Alexa and Jason are in the midst of a competition for the same promotion at their advertising firm, when each of their significant others breaks up with them. After Alexa accidentally sends Jason a brokenhearted text message, they start up an anonymous relationship through text and voice messages, unaware of who the other actually is.

Cast
 Brenda Song as Alexa
 Aaron O'Connell as Jason
 Denise Richards as Debra
 Maxwell Caulfield as Craig
 Brooke Newton as Hannah
 Pedro Correa as Brad
 Gib Gerard as Perry
 Marc Anthony Samuel as Trey

Production
On April 13, 2022, it was announced that the film will be the first original movie released by Amazon Freevee, and that it would star Brenda Song, Aaron O'Connell, Denise Richards, and Maxwell Caulfield.

Release
The trailer was released on June 6, 2022. The film was released on Amazon Freevee on July 15, 2022.

Reception
On Rotten Tomatoes, the film has an approval rating of 13% based on 8 reviews, with an average rating of 4.00/10.  Radhika Menon of Decider wrote, "It's cheesy, which isn't a fault on its own, but doesn't back itself up with the heart it thinks it's delivering," concluding that "the film under-uses Brenda Song." Ferdosa Abdi of Screen Rant rated it 1.5 stars out of 5, calling it "a flimsy story with poor chemistry."

References

External links 
 

American romantic comedy films
2022 romantic comedy films
2020s English-language films
2020s American films